Marzena Diakun (born 3 April 1981, Koszalin) is a Polish conductor.

Early life and education
She was born in 1981 in Koszalin in northern Poland. She attended the Grażyna Bacewicz Music School in Koszalin. In 2005, she graduated with honours from the Karol Lipiński Academy of Music in Wrocław where she studied conducting.

She made her conducting debut when she was still a student at the academy. She conducted at the 17th International Festival of Drum Music with the Koszalin Philharmonic. She then became an assistant of Jerzy Maksymiuk. In 2006, she continued her studies at the University of Music and Performing Arts in Vienna under Uroš Lajovic.

Career
She worked as an assistant to Andrey Boreyko performing with the Bern Symphony Orchestra. She conducted with such orchestras as Prague Radio Symphony Orchestra, Orchestre National de Lyon, Polish National Radio Symphony Orchestra, Orquestra Sinfônica do Estado de São Paulo, Bournemouth Symphony Orchestra, Philharmonisches Staatsorchester Hamburg, and Jenaer Philharmonie.

After graduation she further trained under the supervision of Gabriel Chmura, Kurt Masur, Colin Metters, Howard Griffiths, David Zinman and Pierre Boulez.

Between 2009–2012, she headed the Spanish contemporary music band Smash Ensemble. In 2010, she obtained a doctoral degree from the Academy of Music in Kraków. Since 2011, she has worked as an assistant professor at the Karol Lipiński Academy of Music in Wrocław. In 2012, she won second prize at the Grzegorz Fitelberg International Competition for Conductors in Katowice. She also won second prize at the 59th Prague Spring Competition for Conductors in the Czech Republic. Between 2015–2017, she was an assistant to Mikko Franck, the principal conductor of the Orchestre philharmonique de Radio France. In 2015, she received a scholarship from the Boston Symphony Orchestra at the Tanglewood Music Festival. In 2016, she was awarded the Paszport Polityki Award in the category of classical music.

See also
Music of Poland

References

Living people
1981 births
Polish conductors (music)
Women conductors (music)
21st-century conductors (music)
People from Koszalin
21st-century Polish musicians
21st-century women musicians
University of Music and Performing Arts Vienna alumni